Opary is a rural locality (a village) in Chaykovsky, Perm Krai, Russia. The population was 80 as of 2010. There are 2 streets.

Geography 
Opary is located 28 km northeast of Chaykovsky. Koryaki BNP is the nearest rural locality.

References 

Rural localities in Chaykovsky urban okrug